The first season of Law & Order: Criminal Intent, an American police procedural television series, was developed by Dick Wolf and René Balcer. It began airing on September 30, 2001, on NBC, a national broadcast television network in the United States. It is the second spin-off of the long-running crime drama Law & Order.

Law & Order: Criminal Intent follows the New York City Police Department's fictional Major Case Squad, which investigates high-profile murder cases. The first season of twenty-two episodes concluded its initial airing on May 10, 2002. Four actors received star billing in the first season: Vincent D'Onofrio, Kathryn Erbe, Jamey Sheridan, and Courtney B. Vance.

Episodes depict Detectives Robert Goren (D'Onofrio) and Alexandra Eames (Erbe) as the squad's lead investigators. Captain James Deakins (Sheridan) is the detectives' direct supervisor and head of the Major Case Squad. Assistant District Attorney Ron Carver (Vance) often attempts to obtain confessions from the suspects, rather than taking them to trial. Law & Order: Criminal Intent focuses on the actions and motives of the criminals, and it divides screen time equally between the suspects and victims and the police's investigation. 

The season was filmed on location in New York City.   Scenes set inside the Major Case Squad department were filmed in a studio at Chelsea Piers, Manhattan.

The season was nominated for four awards and was described by some reviewers as the most impressive of all the Law & Order series. It was sold to numerous television stations around the world, and it has been adapted into localized foreign versions in Russia and France. It has been syndicated in the US on a number of cable channels. A DVD box set of Season 1 was released in America on October 21, 2003, and episodes are available for purchase at the US iTunes Store and Amazon Video on Demand.

Production 
Law & Order: Criminal Intent is the third series in the Law & Order crime drama franchise, which was created by Dick Wolf in 1990. He developed it with René Balcer, who began working on the original series during its first season. During his time on Law & Order, Balcer was promoted to head writer, show runner, and executive producer before leaving in 2000. News first broke of a new series in late 2000, when it was reported that NBC, broadcaster of Law & Order and Law & Order: Special Victims Unit, approached Wolf Films and Studios USA about a second spin-off.

Balcer and Wolf conceived Law & Order: Criminal Intent as a police procedural crime drama that follows a distinct division of the New York City Police Department: the 'Major Case Squad', and its investigations in to high-profile murder cases, such as those involving VIPs, local government officials and employees, and people working in the financial industry and the arts and entertainment world. Unlike the other series in the Law & Order franchise, Law & Order: Criminal Intent gives significant attention to the actions and motives of the criminals, rather than primarily focusing on the police investigation and trial prosecution. Episodes do not contain trials, and end in confessions rather than plea bargains or verdicts.

Production began in January 2001, shooting on location in and around New York City using local color. The main set of One Police Plaza is located at Pier 62, Chelsea Piers, Manhattan. Thirteen episodes were initially ordered, and were completed by April 2001, so that production would not be halted by a potential strike from the Writers Guild of America. Balcer was the show runner, executive producer and head writer on the first season of Law & Order: Criminal Intent. Wolf was also credited as an executive producer, as with all other Law & Order series. The first season gave co-executive producers credits to Peter Jankowski, Fred Berner, Geoffrey Neigher, and Arthur W. Forney. John L. Roman, Roz Weinman, and Eric Overmyer were named producers, with Michael Kewley a co-producer. Theresa Rebeck and Marlane Meyer were consulting producers. Twelve people directed, and nine people wrote the twenty-two episodes; Constantine Makris directed four episodes, and Balcer wrote or co-wrote ten episodes.

Cast 

Law & Order: Criminal Intent is not an ensemble series, and therefore differs from Law & Order and Law & Order: Special Victims Unit which respectively featured six and eight actors receiving star billing during the same broadcast season. Movie actor Vincent D'Onofrio was offered the lead role of Detective Robert Goren, a hyper-intuitive contemporary Sherlock Holmes-type investigator who used to work for the US Military Police. Other than a 1998 guest role on Homicide: Life on the Street that earned him an Emmy nomination, this was D'Onofrio's first major television role. Goren's partner, former vice squad detective Alexandra Eames, was played by Kathryn Erbe who had just completed a role on Oz as convicted murderer Shirley Bellinger. Balcer stated Eames was cast because "she just looked like a real cop." Courtney B. Vance plays Assistant District Attorney Ron Carver, a graduate of John Jay College of Criminal Justice. Jamey Sheridan was the last actor to be cast in a main role, taking the part of James Deakins, a "seasoned" NYPD Captain. In a recurring role, Leslie Hendrix appeared as Assistant Chief Medical Examiner Elizabeth Rodgers, the same character she had played in the other two series. Steve Zirnkilton provides a voice-over at the beginning of each episode's opening credits, saying "In New York City's war on crime, the worst criminal offenders are pursued by the detectives of the Major Case Squad. These are their stories."

There were several guest stars in the episodes of this series, such as:

Jake Weber as Karl Atwood, a professional thief and murderer
Lenny Venito as Jake Nathan, an accomplice of Karl Atwood
Elizabeth Marvel as Sylvia Moon, an artist and at the same time a triple murderer and a forger
Lynn Cohen as Mina Cohen, employee of the Holocaust Foundation
Michael O'Keefe as Father Michael McShale, the church father St. Justin and the murderer of Kevin Donovan
Alex Feldman as Kevin Donovan, Father McShale's drug-addicted son and Morris Abernathy's killer
Peter McRobbie as Father Capanna
Stephen Henderson as Morris Abernathy, the sacristan of St. Justin church who is assassinated by Donovan
Roy Thinnes as Sheridan Beckworth
Griffin Dunne as Henry Talbott, a corrupt lawyer and a serial killer
Karen Young as Denise Talbott, Henry's credulous wife
Thomas G. Waites as Mo Turman, the owner of Mo's Diner cafeteria
Eric Thal as Denis Dupont / Didier Foucault, a swiss swindler and murderer
John Doman as Roy Markham
Terry Serpico as Leslie Roche
Steven Marcus as Tom Santini
Jerry Orbach as Det. Lennie Briscoe
Jesse L. Martin as Ed Green
John Heard as Larry Wiegert
Robert Hogan as Judge Van Vliet
Kate Burton as Stephanie Uffland
Robert Lyle Knepper as Dr. Peter Kelmer, a plastic surgeon who murdered his wife
David Aaron Baker as Edward Sternman
Lothaire Bluteau as Rick Zainer, a nurse and at the same time, a facilitator of assassinations
Robert Stanton as Dennis Griscom, a Christian fanatic and at the same time, a sniper and murderer who killed Leo Cavella, an abortion doctor
Michael Gross as Dr. Charles Webb, a psychiatrist and at the same time, a murderer
J. K. Simmons as Dr. Emil Skoda
Jenna Stern as Julie Feldman, a murder suspect, but later found innocent
Ritchie Coster as Simon Matic, a former Serb Volunteer Guard soldier, muscle mafia, kidnapper and rapist
Frank Pellegrino as Carl Pettijohn
Michael Murphy as Judge Peter Blakemore, a corrupt judge
George DiCenzo as Judge Raoul Sabatelli, a book author and supreme court judge who murdered Emily Trudeau
Michael Emerson as Gerry Rankin, a con man and double murderer posing as a United Nations economist
David Thornton as Kenneth Strick, a real estate heir who murdered his friend IIana Yushka
Alla Kliouka Schaffer as Ilana Yushka, a book author and daughter of a prominent Russian mobster, murdered by her friend Kenneth Strick
Viola Davis as Sergeant Terry Randolph, Lieutenant Van Buren's student who became a dirty cop, serial killer, and family annihilator
S. Epatha Merkerson as Anita Van Buren
Mia Dillon as Barb Windemere, a woman who claims to be Erica Windemere's adoptive mother, but later, was false
Remak Ramsay as Douglas Lafferty, a reporter who was interested in the story of Erica Windemere, when he discovered that it was a "house of cards", was going to make it public, but was killed by the book editor, Christine Wilkes
Polly Draper as Christine Wilkes, a book editor who became famous for her book Through the Darkness, which recounted the story of Erica Widemere, a girl who was raped. When reporter Douglas Lafferty discovered that the story was false and was used to steal people's money, Wilkes murdered him so that he would not expose the truth
Bruce Altman as Jack Crawley, a con artist, conspirator, and power assassin who acts as the chief financial officer of Mattawin Corporation, a company dedicated to the sale of water and land

Distribution 
The first season of Law & Order: Criminal Intent premiered during the 2001–2002 television season on the American terrestrial television network NBC. The pilot episode, titled "One", aired on Sunday September 30, 2001 at 9:00 p.m. EST. Episodes aired weekly until December, when the show took a brief hiatus until January, and took another hiatus during February. The final episode of the season aired at 9:00 p.m. on Friday May 10, 2002. Under a $100,000-per-episode shared or second window syndication agreement that cable channel USA Network made with NBC, USA Network was allowed to broadcast episodes out of primetime a week after their premiere on NBC. The season is also under a regular off-network syndication deal at USA Networks and Bravo. The two channels teamed up late 2004 to pay $2 million per episode for the syndication rights to the series, allowing USA Network to air episodes during the week, and Bravo to air episodes at the weekend. In 2007, Fox Television Stations, a group of Fox Broadcasting Company owned-and-operated stations, entered a syndication deal to broadcast episodes as part of its daytime schedule. From late 2009, MyNetworkTV will broadcast Law & Order: Criminal Intent, including episodes from season one, having changed their business model from a network broadcaster to a syndication programming service. The series has also been distributed to international broadcasters. It aired in Canada on CTV, in France on TF1, in the United Kingdom on Hallmark Channel and Five, in Australia on Network Ten, and in New Zealand on TV3.

Episodes of Law & Order: Criminal Intents first season have been adapted into localized foreign versions. Russian:  (lit. Law & Order: Criminal Mind), premiered in 2007 on NTV (Russia) and is produced by Global American Television, Studio2B and NTV, Wolf Films and NBC Universal. On May 3, 2007, the French Law & Order: Criminal Intent broadcaster, TF1, began airing Paris enquêtes criminelles, a co-production from TF1 and ALMA, Wolf Films and NBC Universal. All eight episodes of Paris enquêtes criminelless first season, two episodes from the second season, and one third-season episode were adapted from Law & Order: Criminal Intent first-season episodes. Wolf stated that Law & Order: Criminal Intent has been sold to foreign networks because it is easier to adapt into local legal systems than Law & Order, where half of each episode occurs in the courtroom.

The season is available in a number of new media formats. Universal Studios Home Entertainment released it in a 6-disc DVD box set on October 21, 2003 in Region 1, titled Law & Order: Criminal Intent – The First Year. The pilot episode was also released on a separate DVD on June 3, 2003. Consumers in the US can purchase and download episodes from the iTunes Store and Amazon Video on Demand.

Reception 
Laura Fries of Variety commented on the difference between this series and Law & Order and Law & Order: Special Victims Unit: "By scrutinizing motive and intent, Criminal Intent utilizes a more personal style that sets it apart from its brethren. Wolf's characters are notoriously devoid of detailed personal lives, but debut [episode] hints at a little more introspection on the part of the characters". In Entertainment Weekly, Ken Tucker wrote that Law & Order: Criminal Intent was the best series of the year from the Law & Order franchise and that while Law & Order suffered from tired, wooden performances from actors with poor chemistry, the acting on Law & Order: Criminal Intent was at "the other end of the spectrum." Both writers commented on the overpowering screen presence that D'Onofrio commands in the first episode: "Criminal Intent so far is a one-man show with Vincent D'Onofrio at its center. [He] commands the most attention, tending to overshadow Erbe, who is reduced in the pilot to following Goren with an awe-struck look," wrote Fries, while Tucker also stated, "D'Onofrio is so eccentrically entertaining, even his costar Kathryn Erbe seems fascinated", but complained that Erbe's role was smaller than D'Onofrio's, which "jibes with the subtle range she showed on [HBO's] Oz and proves her professional generosity." He also said Sheridan "is similarly nonplussed and under-utilized," but "Vance is terrific [as Carver], who makes defendants wither in the face of his elegantly reasoned cross-examinations."

Law & Order: Criminal Intents first season received four nominations from three award ceremonies. "The Faithful" and "Smothered" were given commendations at the Prism Awards in the category for Best TV Drama Series Episode. Vance was nominated in the Outstanding Actor in a Drama Series category at the 2002 NAACP Image Awards. René Balcer received an Edgar Award nomination for "Tuxedo Hill". Casting director Lynn Kressel was nominated at the Casting Society of America Artios Awards in the category for Best Casting for TV in a Dramatic Pilot.

Episodes 

{| class="wikitable plainrowheaders" style="width:100%"
|- style="color:white"
! style="background:#005B83;"|No. inseries
! style="background:#005B83;"|No. inseason
! style="background:#005B83;"|Title
! style="background:#005B83;"|Directed by
! style="background:#005B83;"|Written by
! style="background:#005B83;"|Original air date
! style="background:#005B83;"|Productioncode
! style="background:#005B83;"|U.S. viewers(millions)

|}

References 

Law & Order: Criminal Intent episodes
2001 American television seasons
2002 American television seasons
Works about the Serbian Mafia